Osvaldo Francisco Canobbio Pittaluga (born 17 February 1973) is a Uruguayan football manager and former player who played as a forward. He is currently the youth team coach of Liverpool Montevideo.

Playing career

Club
Canobbio started his senior career in 1988 with River Plate Montevideo. They were relegated to Uruguayan Segunda División in 1990. They were promoted back to Uruguayan Primera División in 1991. The finished second in the league in 1992.

By 1994 Canobbio had joined Nacional. He then moved to Argentina in 1996 and started playing for Deportivo Español. In Argentina he also joined Tallares (in 1997) and Racing Club (in 1998) where he became the highest goalscorer of the team.

In 2002 Osvaldo moved to Chile and joined Cobreloa and participated in Copa Libertadores.

After almost fourteen years playing in South America, Osvaldo moved to China to join Yunnan Hongta, a team which used to participate in the Chinese League.

Between 2004 and 2007, Osvaldo has played for his former team River Plate. Then he played for Honduran club Olimpia. He joined Liverpool Montevideo in July 2007.

International
Canobbio was part of Uruguay squad at 1991 FIFA World Youth Championship. He played eight matches and scored two goals for the senior team between 1993 and 1997.

Personal life
Canobbio's son Agustín is a current Uruguayan international.

Career statistics

International

Scores and results list Uruguay's goal tally first, score column indicates score after each Canobbio goal.

References

External links

1973 births
Living people
Uruguayan footballers
Uruguay under-20 international footballers
Uruguay international footballers
Uruguayan expatriate footballers
Newell's Old Boys footballers
Deportivo Español footballers
Racing Club de Avellaneda footballers
Talleres de Córdoba footballers
Club Atlético Huracán footballers
Cobreloa footballers
C.D. Olimpia players
Club Atlético River Plate (Montevideo) players
Juventud de Las Piedras players
Cerro Largo F.C. players
Club Nacional de Football players
Liverpool F.C. (Montevideo) players
Liga Nacional de Fútbol Profesional de Honduras players
Argentine Primera División players
Uruguayan Primera División players
Expatriate footballers in Argentina
Expatriate footballers in Chile
Expatriate footballers in China
Expatriate footballers in Honduras
Uruguayan football managers
El Tanque Sisley managers
Association football forwards
Liverpool F.C. (Montevideo) managers